Minister of Foreign Affairs of the Republic of Malawi is a cabinet minister in charge of the Ministry of Foreign Affairs of Malawi, responsible for conducting foreign relations of the country.

The following is a list of foreign ministers of Malawi since its founding in 1964:

References

Foreign
Foreign Ministers
Politicians
Foreign Ministers of Malawi